Csaba Csutorás (13 September 1937 Budapest, Hungary – 25 August 2014) was a Hungarian sprinter who competed in the 1960 Summer Olympics and in the 1964 Summer Olympics.

References

1937 births
2014 deaths
Athletes from Budapest
Hungarian male sprinters
Olympic athletes of Hungary
Athletes (track and field) at the 1960 Summer Olympics
Athletes (track and field) at the 1964 Summer Olympics
Universiade medalists in athletics (track and field)
Universiade gold medalists for Hungary
Medalists at the 1963 Summer Universiade
Medalists at the 1965 Summer Universiade